Stepanovsky (masculine), Stepanovskaya (feminine), or Stepanovskoye (neuter) is the name of several rural localities in Russia.

Modern localities

Arkhangelsk Oblast
As of 2014, twelve rural localities in Arkhangelsk Oblast bear this name:

Stepanovskaya, Kotlassky District, Arkhangelsk Oblast, a village in Zabelinsky Selsoviet of Kotlassky District; 
Stepanovskaya, Alexeyevsky Selsoviet, Krasnoborsky District, Arkhangelsk Oblast, a village in Alexeyevsky Selsoviet of Krasnoborsky District; 
Stepanovskaya, Belosludsky Selsoviet, Krasnoborsky District, Arkhangelsk Oblast, a village in Belosludsky Selsoviet of Krasnoborsky District; 
Stepanovskaya, Lyakhovsky Selsoviet, Krasnoborsky District, Arkhangelsk Oblast, a village in Lyakhovsky Selsoviet of Krasnoborsky District; 
Stepanovskaya, Plesetsky District, Arkhangelsk Oblast, a village in Kenoretsky Selsoviet of Plesetsky District; 
Stepanovskaya, Primorsky District, Arkhangelsk Oblast, a village in Koskogorsky Selsoviet of Primorsky District; 
Stepanovskaya, Tarnyansky Selsoviet, Shenkursky District, Arkhangelsk Oblast, a village in Tarnyansky Selsoviet of Shenkursky District; 
Stepanovskaya, Verkhopadengsky Selsoviet, Shenkursky District, Arkhangelsk Oblast, a village in Verkhopadengsky Selsoviet of Shenkursky District; 
Stepanovskaya, Nizhnetoyemsky Selsoviet, Verkhnetoyemsky District, Arkhangelsk Oblast, a village in Nizhnetoyemsky Selsoviet of Verkhnetoyemsky District; 
Stepanovskaya, Novovershinsky Selsoviet, Verkhnetoyemsky District, Arkhangelsk Oblast, a village in Novovershinsky Selsoviet of Verkhnetoyemsky District; 
Stepanovskaya, Vyysky Selsoviet, Verkhnetoyemsky District, Arkhangelsk Oblast, a village in Vyysky Selsoviet of Verkhnetoyemsky District; 
Stepanovskaya, Vinogradovsky District, Arkhangelsk Oblast, a village in Zaostrovsky Selsoviet of Vinogradovsky District;

Kaluga Oblast
As of 2014, two rural localities in Kaluga Oblast bear this name:
Stepanovskoye, Ferzikovsky District, Kaluga Oblast, a village in Ferzikovsky District
Stepanovskoye, Medynsky District, Kaluga Oblast, a village in Medynsky District

Kirov Oblast
As of 2014, one rural locality in Kirov Oblast bears this name:

Stepanovskaya, Kirov Oblast, a village in Ichetovkinsky Rural Okrug of Afanasyevsky District;

Komi Republic
As of 2014, one rural locality in the Komi Republic bears this name:

Stepanovskaya, Komi Republic, a village in Zamezhnaya Selo Administrative Territory of Ust-Tsilemsky District;

Moscow Oblast
As of 2014, two rural localities in Moscow Oblast bear this name:

Stepanovskoye, Krasnogorsky District, Moscow Oblast, a village in Ilyinskoye Rural Settlement of Krasnogorsky District; 
Stepanovskoye, Ramensky District, Moscow Oblast, a selo in Ulyaninskoye Rural Settlement of Ramensky District;

Nizhny Novgorod Oblast
As of 2014, one rural locality in Nizhny Novgorod Oblast bears this name:

Stepanovskoye, Nizhny Novgorod Oblast, a village in Pakalevsky Selsoviet of Tonkinsky District;

Orenburg Oblast
As of 2014, one rural locality in Orenburg Oblast bears this name:
Stepanovsky (rural locality), a khutor in Stepanovsky Selsoviet of Orenburgsky District

Vologda Oblast
As of 2014, seven rural localities in Vologda Oblast bear this name:
Stepanovskoye, Vologda Oblast, a village in Sheybukhtovsky Selsoviet of Mezhdurechensky District
Stepanovskaya, Kirillovsky District, Vologda Oblast, a village in Lipovsky Selsoviet of Kirillovsky District
Stepanovskaya, Ozeretsky Selsoviet, Tarnogsky District, Vologda Oblast, a village in Ozeretsky Selsoviet of Tarnogsky District
Stepanovskaya, Verkhnekokshengsky Selsoviet, Tarnogsky District, Vologda Oblast, a village in Verkhnekokshengsky Selsoviet of Tarnogsky District
Stepanovskaya, Vozhegodsky District, Vologda Oblast, a village in Maryinsky Selsoviet of Vozhegodsky District
Stepanovskaya, Kemsky Selsoviet, Vytegorsky District, Vologda Oblast, a village in Kemsky Selsoviet of Vytegorsky District
Stepanovskaya, Semenovsky Selsoviet, Vytegorsky District, Vologda Oblast, a village in Semenovsky Selsoviet of Vytegorsky District

Yaroslavl Oblast
As of 2014, one rural locality in Yaroslavl Oblast bears this name:
Stepanovskoye, Yaroslavl Oblast, a village in Volzhsky Rural Okrug of Rybinsky District

Alternative names
Stepanovsky, alternative name of Stepanovka, a village in Uvalo-Yadrinsky Rural Okrug of Lyubinsky District in Omsk Oblast; 
Stepanovsky, alternative name of Syuren, a khutor in Uralsky Selsoviet of Kugarchinsky District in the Republic of Bashkortostan; 
Stepanovskaya, alternative name of Stepanovskaya Bolshaya, a village in Peschansky Selsoviet of Kotlassky District in Arkhangelsk Oblast; 
Stepanovskaya, alternative name of Stepankovskaya, a village in Pakshengsky Selsoviet of Velsky District in Arkhangelsk Oblast; 
Stepanovskaya, alternative name of Zarechye, a village in Savvinskoye Rural Settlement of Yegoryevsky District in Moscow Oblast;